Robert Fortune Sanchez (20 March 1934 – 20 January 2012) was the Archbishop of the Roman Catholic Archdiocese of Santa Fe, New Mexico, in the United States.

Biography 
Born in Socorro, New Mexico, he was the son of Julius Caesar Sanchez and Priscilla Fortune, whose ancestors included the first Spanish colonists in the region, then part of New Spain. As a teenager Sanchez felt a religious calling to the Catholic priesthood and entered the Immaculate Heart Seminary of the Archdiocese to this end, completing his college studies at St. Michael's College, now the Santa Fe University of Art and Design. Showing great promise, he was sent to study theology at the Pontifical North American College in Rome. At the completion of these studies, he was ordained to the priesthood there for the Archdiocese of Santa Fe on 20 December 1959, by the Rector of the College, Archbishop Martin John O'Connor.

After his ordination, Sanchez returned to New Mexico. He was then assigned by Archbishop Edwin Byrne to a parish in Albuquerque, New Mexico. He also served in several positions in a local Catholic high school, for which he earned a teaching certificate from the University of New Mexico in 1964. Sanchez earned a degree in canon law as well from the Catholic University of America in Washington, D.C. He went on to serve in various positions of leadership in the Archdiocese, including that of Vicar General.

Pope Paul VI appointed Sanchez to head the Archdiocese on 1 July 1974. He was the first Hispanic to be named an archbishop of the Catholic Church in the United States.  He was consecrated on the 25th of that same month by the Apostolic Delegate to the United States, Archbishop Jean Jadot. He was assisted in this by Bishop Patrick Flores of San Antonio, the first Hispanic bishop in the country. The service was attended by 14,000 people.

Sanchez became a noted spokesman for the Latino community within the hierarchy of the Catholic Church in the United States and spoke out often on political issues affecting this population. He established models for outreach to ethnic minorities of use throughout the county. He offered an official apology to the Native Americans of the Southwest for how both his Spanish ancestors and the Catholic Church had treated them. He ordained the first Native American to be named a bishop in the Catholic Church, for the Roman Catholic Diocese of Gallup, Donald Pelotte.

Many new pastoral plans to meet the needs of the people of the Southwestern United States were developed by Sanchez to meet the challenges of a new era. He was a leading participant in the Committee of the United States bishops writing a letter on the Hispanic presence in the American Church. Pope John Paul II named him to the Pontifical Commission on Immigration Affairs. He also wrote what was considered to be the most comprehensive Pastoral Letter on HIV/AIDS at that time.

In the early 1990s, several women came forth, accusing the archbishop of having been sexually involved with them. Sanchez admitted to the affairs. He was also criticized for alleged failures to act on priests of the Archdiocese who were accused of abusing children. This led him to resign his post on 6 April 1993. Later in 1993, Archbishop Sanchez moved to the midwest and then specifically to Minnesota where he helped on a farm run by the Sisters of Mercy near Jackson, MN. In 1995, it was reported that he returned to New Mexico to visit family and, in 1997, he led a retreat for priests in Tucson, Arizona. Later, he moved back to the southwest to live with the retired Friars Minor of the region, not making any public appearances, until 2009 when he was transferred to a facility for patients suffering from Alzheimer's disease.

Death
He died on 20 January 2012, aged 77.

Notes

1934 births
2012 deaths
American people of Spanish descent
Roman Catholic archbishops of Santa Fe
20th-century Roman Catholic archbishops in the United States
21st-century Roman Catholic archbishops in the United States
People from Socorro, New Mexico
Catholic Church sexual abuse scandals in the United States
Santa Fe University of Art and Design alumni
Catholic University of America alumni
Neurological disease deaths in New Mexico
Deaths from Alzheimer's disease